Woodbourne may refer to:

in New Zealand
Woodbourne, New Zealand, settlement in Marlborough, New Zealand
RNZAF Base Woodbourne, New Zealand

in the United States
(by state)
Woodbourne House, Louisville, KY, listed on the NRHP in Kentucky
Woodbourne Historic District, Boston, MA, listed on the NRHP in Massachusetts
Woodbourne, New York
Woodbourne Reformed Church Complex, Woodbourne, NY, listed on the NRHP in New York
Woodbourne (Roxobel, North Carolina), listed on the NRHP in North Carolina
Woodbourne, Pennsylvania
Woodbourne (Forest, Virginia), listed on the NRHP in Virginia
Woodbourne (Madison, Virginia), listed on the NRHP in Virginia